is a 1984 Japanese kaiju film directed by Koji Hashimoto, with special effects by Teruyoshi Nakano. The film features the fictional monster character Godzilla. Distributed by Toho and produced under their subsidiary Toho Pictures, it is the 16th film in the Godzilla franchise, the last film produced in the Shōwa era, and the first film in the Heisei series. In Japan, the film was followed by Godzilla vs. Biollante in 1989.

The Return of Godzilla stars Ken Tanaka, Yasuko Sawaguchi, Yosuke Natsuki, and Keiju Kobayashi, with Kenpachiro Satsuma as Godzilla. The film serves as both a sequel to the original 1954 film and a reboot of the franchise that ignores the events of every Shōwa era film aside from the original Godzilla, placing itself in line with the darker tone and themes of the original film and returning Godzilla to his destructive, antagonistic roots. The film was released theatrically in Japan on December 15, 1984. The following year, a heavily-re-edited localized version, titled Godzilla 1985, was released in the United States by New World Pictures; it features new footage, with Raymond Burr reprising his role from Godzilla, King of the Monsters! (1956), itself an American localization of Godzilla (1954).

Plot
The Japanese fishing vessel Yahata Maru is caught in strong currents off the shores of Daikoku Island. As the boat drifts into shore, the island begins to erupt, and a giant monster lifts itself out of the volcano. A few days later, reporter Goro Maki is sailing in the area and finds the vessel intact but deserted. As he explores the vessel, he finds all the crew dead except for Hiroshi Okumura, who has been badly wounded. Suddenly a giant Shockirus sea louse  attacks him but he is saved by Okumura.

In Tokyo, Okumura realizes by looking at pictures that the monster he saw was a new Godzilla. Maki writes an article about the account, but the news of Godzilla's return is kept secret  and his article is withheld. Maki visits Professor Hayashida, whose parents were lost in the 1954 Godzilla attack. Hayashida describes Godzilla as a living, invincible nuclear weapon able to cause mass destruction. At Hayashida's laboratory, Maki meets Okumura's sister, Naoko, and informs her that her brother is alive and at the police hospital.

A Soviet submarine is destroyed in the Pacific. The Soviets believe the attack was perpetrated by the Americans, and a diplomatic crisis ensues, which threatens to escalate into nuclear war. The Japanese intervene and reveal that Godzilla was behind the attacks. The Japanese cabinet meets to discuss Japan's defense. A new weapon is revealed, the Super X, a specially-armored flying fortress that will defend the capital. The Japanese military is put on alert.

Godzilla attacks the Ihama nuclear power plant in Shizuoka Prefecture. While feeding off the reactor, it is distracted by a flock of birds and leaves the facility. Hayashida believes that Godzilla was distracted instinctively by a homing signal from the birds. Hayashida, together with geologist Minami, propose to the Japanese Cabinet, that Godzilla could be lured back to Mount Mihara on Ōshima Island by a similar signal, and a volcanic eruption could be started, capturing Godzilla.

Prime Minister Mitamura meets with Soviet and American envoys and declares that nuclear weapons will not be used on Godzilla, even if Godzilla were to attack the Japanese mainland. Meanwhile, the Soviets have their own plans to counter the threat posed by Godzilla, and a Soviet control ship disguised as a freighter in Tokyo Harbor prepares to launch a nuclear missile from one of their orbiting satellites should Godzilla attack.

Godzilla is sighted at dawn in Tokyo Bay heading towards Tokyo, causing mass evacuations. The JASDF attacks Godzilla but fails to stop his advance on the city. Godzilla soon emerges and makes short work of the JSDF stationed there. The battle causes damage to the Soviet ship and starts a missile launch countdown. The captain dies as he attempts to stop the missile from launching. Godzilla proceeds towards Shinjuku, wreaking havoc along the way. Godzilla is confronted by four laser-armed trucks and the Super X. Because Godzilla's heart is similar to a nuclear reactor, the cadmium shells that are fired into its mouth by the Super X seal and slow down its heart, knocking Godzilla unconscious.

The countdown ends and the Soviet missile is launched, but it is destroyed by an American counter-missile. Hayashida and Okumura are extracted from Tokyo via helicopter and taken to Mt. Mihara to set up the homing device before the two missiles collide above Tokyo. The destruction of the nuclear missile produces an electrical storm and an EMP, which revives Godzilla once more and temporarily disables the Super X.

An enraged Godzilla bears down on the Super X just as it manages to get airborne again. The Super X's weapons prove ineffective against the kaiju, resulting in even more destruction in the city as Godzilla chases it through several skyscrapers. Godzilla finally destroys the Super X by dropping a skyscraper on top of it. Godzilla continues its rampage until Hayashida uses the homing device to distract it. Godzilla leaves Tokyo and swims across Tokyo Bay, following the homing device to Mount Mihara. There, Godzilla follows the device and falls into the mouth of the volcano. Okumura activates detonators at the volcano, creating a controlled eruption that traps Godzilla inside.

Cast

Production

Development
After the box office failure of Terror of Mechagodzilla, Toho attempted to reinvigorate the franchise several times during the late 1970s and early 1980s. The first attempt was the announcement of a color remake of the original 1954 film entitled The Rebirth of Godzilla in 1977, but the project was shelved. A year later, it was announced that Toho would develop a film jointly with UPA studios entitled Godzilla vs. the Devil, though this, along with UPA producer Henry G. Saperstein's proposed Godzilla vs. Gargantua, also never materialized.

Godzilla series creator Tomoyuki Tanaka took charge of reviving the franchise in 1979, Godzilla's 25th anniversary, intending to return the series to its dark, anti-nuclear roots in the wake of the Three Mile Island accident. Hoping to win back adult audiences alienated by the fantastical approach to Godzilla films taken during the 1970s, Tanaka was further encouraged in his vision by the contemporary success of adult-oriented horror and science fiction movies like King Kong, Invasion of the Body Snatchers, Alien and The Thing. A draft story entitled Resurrection of Godzilla was submitted by Tanaka and Akira Murao in 1980, and had Godzilla pitted against a shape-shifting monster called Bakan in the backdrop of an illegal nuclear waste disposal site. In 1983, Murao and Hideichi Nagahara collaborated on a revised script for Resurrection of Godzilla, however, the project was cancelled due to budgetary concerns. That same year, American director Steve Miner proposed directing a Godzilla film at his own expense. Toho approved of the project, and Miner hired Fred Dekker to write the screenplay and paleosculptor Steve Czerkas to redesign the monster. The project was however hampered by Miner's insistence on using prohibitively costly stop-motion animation and shooting the film in 3D, and was thus rejected by major American movie studios. Under pressure from a 10,000-member group of Japanese Godzilla fans calling themselves the "Godzilla Resurrection Committee", Tanaka decided to helm a Japanese film for "strictly domestic consumption" to be released jointly alongside Miner's movie.

In an effort to disavow Godzilla's increasingly heroic and anthropomorphic depiction in previous films, Tanaka insisted on making a direct sequel to the original 1954 movie. He hired screenwriter Shuichi Nagahara, who wrote a screenplay combining elements of the previously cancelled The Resurrection of Godzilla and Miner's still unproduced film, including an intensification of hostilities during the Cold War and a flying fortress which fires missiles into Godzilla's mouth. Koji Hashimoto was hired as director after Ishirō Honda declined the offer, as he was assisting Akira Kurosawa with Kagemusha and Ran, and felt that the franchise should have been discontinued after the death of Eiji Tsuburaya.

Composer Akira Ifukube was offered to score the film but respectfully declined. At the time, it was rumored that Ifukube refused to participate in the film due to the changes made to Godzilla, stating, "I do not write music for 80-meter monsters". However, this quote was later clarified, by Ifukube's biographer Erik Homenick and Japanese Giants editor Ed Godziszewski, as a joke spread by fans which was later misinterpreted as fact. Ifukube declined to score the film due to his priorities, at the time, teaching composition at the Tokyo College of Music.

Special effects
The special effects were directed by Teruyoshi Nakano, who had directed the special effects of several previous Godzilla films. This meant that the miniatures had to be built to a th scale, and this contributed to an increase in the budget of the film to $6.25 million. Tanaka and Nakano supervised suit-maker Noboyuki Yasumaru in constructing a new Godzilla design, incorporating ears and four toes, features not seen since Godzilla Raids Again. Nakano insisted on infusing elements into the design that suggested sadness, such as downward-slanting eyes and sloping shoulders.

Suit construction took two months, and consisted of separately casting body-part molds with urethane on a pre-built, life-size statue of the final design. Yasumaru personally took charge of all phases of suit-building, unlike in previous productions wherein the different stages of suit-production were handled by different craftsmen. The final suit was constructed to accommodate stuntman Hiroshi Yamawaki, but he declined suddenly, and was replaced by veteran suit actor Kenpachiro Satsuma, who had portrayed Hedorah and Gigan in the Showa Era. Because the  suit wasn't built to his measurements, Satsuma had difficulty performing, being able to last only ten minutes within it, and losing 12 pounds during filming. Hoping to avoid having Godzilla move in an overly human fashion, Nakano instructed Satsuma to base his actions on Noh, a traditional Japanese dance.

Taking inspiration from the publicity surrounding the 40-foot tall King Kong model from Dino De Laurentiis's 1976 film of the same name, Toho spent a reported ¥52,146 (approximately $475.00) on a 16-foot high robotic Godzilla (dubbed "Cybot") for use in close-up shots of the creature's head. The Cybot consisted of a hydraulically-powered mechanical endoskeleton covered in urethane skin containing 3,000 computer operated parts which permitted it to tilt its head, and move its lips and arms. Unlike previous Godzilla suits, whose lower jaws consisted of wire-operated flaps, the Cybot's jaws were hinged like those of an actual animal, and slid back as they opened. A life-size, crane operated foot was also built for close-up shots of city destruction scenes. Part of the film was shot on location on Izu Ōshima, where the climax of the story takes place.

Release

Theatrical
The Return of Godzilla was released on December 15, 1984 in Japan where it was distributed by Toho. The film sold 3.2 million tickets in Japan, earning  in rentals at the Japanese box office.

Reception
Despite its American re-edit receiving negative reviews, the original Japanese cut of the film has been much more well-received, with critics and fans praising the film's score, practical effects, and its darker tone. In 1985, the film won the Japan Academy Award for Special Effects.

Home video
In May 2016, Kraken Releasing revealed plans to release the original Japanese version of The Return of Godzilla and its international English dub on DVD and Blu-ray in North America on September 13, 2016. However, it was also revealed that the Americanized version of the film, Godzilla 1985 would not be featured in the release due to ongoing copyright issues concerning music cues that New World Pictures borrowed from Def-Con 4 for use in Godzilla 1985.

Alternate English versions

Exported English dub
Shortly after the film's completion, Toho's foreign sales division, Toho International Co., Ltd, had the film dubbed into English by an unidentified firm in Hong Kong. No cuts were made, though credits and other titles were accordingly rendered in English. The international English dub features the voice of news anchor and radio announcer John Culkin in the role of Goro Maki, and actor Barry Haigh as Prime Minister Mitamura. The English version fully dubs all dialogue into English, including that of the Soviet and American characters. The international English dub was released on VHS in the U.K. by Carlton Home Entertainment on July 24, 1998.

In 2016, the international English dub was included on the U.S. DVD and Blu-Ray releases from Kraken, though the audio mix was not the original monaural track that was originally heard on Toho's English language prints. The English dialogue was originally mixed with an alternate music and effects track that contained different music edits and sound effects from the Japanese theatrical version, most notably a distinct "cry" produced by Godzilla during the film's ending. The U.S. home video version instead uses the conventional music and effects track used for the regular Japanese version mixed in DTS 5.1 surround sound instead of mono.

Godzilla 1985

After the film's lackluster performance in the Japanese box office and the ultimate shelving of Steve Miner's Godzilla 3D project, Toho decided to distribute the film overseas in order to regain lost profits. New World Pictures acquired The Return of Godzilla for distribution in North America, and changed the title to Godzilla 1985, bringing back Raymond Burr in order to commemorate the 30th anniversary of Godzilla: King of the Monsters!. Originally, New World reportedly planned to re-write the dialogue in order to turn the film into a tongue-in-cheek comedy starring Leslie Nielsen (à la What's Up, Tiger Lily?), but this plan was reportedly scrapped because Raymond Burr expressed displeasure at the idea, taking the idea of Godzilla as a nuclear metaphor seriously. The only dialogue left over from that script was "That's quite an urban renewal program they've got going on over there," said by Major McDonahue. All of Burr's scenes were filmed in one day to suit his schedule. He was paid US$50,000. The reverse shots, of the actors he was speaking to, were filmed the next day, and the American filming was completed in three days. One of the most controversial changes done on the film was having Soviet Colonel Kashirin deliberately launch the nuclear missile rather than die in attempting to prevent its launch. Director R. J. Kizer later attributed this to New World's management's conservative leanings.

The newly edited film also contained numerous product placements for Dr Pepper, which had twice used Godzilla in its commercials. Dr Pepper's marketing director at one point insisted that Raymond Burr drink Dr Pepper during a scene, and the suggestion was put to the actor by Kizer. Burr reportedly responded by "[fixing] me with one of those withering glares and just said nothing."

Roger Ebert and Vincent Canby gave the film negative reviews.

See also
Kaiju
List of Japanese films of 1984
List of science-fiction films of the 1980s
List of monster movies

Notes

References

Bibliography

External links

The Return of Godzilla at the Movie Review Query Engine

1984 films
1980s Japanese-language films
1980s monster movies
1980s political films
1980s science fiction films
Alternative sequel films
Anti-war films
1980s Russian-language films
Cold War submarine films
Films about nuclear war and weapons
Films about volcanoes
Films directed by Koji Hashimoto
Films produced by Tomoyuki Tanaka
Films set in Tokyo
Films set in Shizuoka Prefecture
Films set on islands
Films shot in Japan
Films shot in Tokyo
Giant monster films
Godzilla films
Japanese political films
Japanese science fiction films
Japanese sequel films
Kaiju films
Reboot films
Toho films
1980s English-language films
1980s Japanese films